A-umlaut may refer to:
Ä, the letter A with an umlaut
Germanic a-mutation, a historic sound change in Northwest Germanic languages
 Å